is a role-playing video game developed by Capcom and Marvelous and published by Capcom for the Nintendo Switch and Windows. It is a spinoff title in the Monster Hunter series and a sequel to Monster Hunter Stories (2016). The game was released worldwide on July 9, 2021.

Gameplay

Plot
The story begins with the mass disappearance of Rathalos around the world seen at a festival ion Hakolo island, as well as large pits emitting a strange, pinkish light appearing everywhere. As the descendant of the legendary Rider named Red, the player character has a fateful encounter with a white-haired Wyverian girl, Ena, who has been entrusted with a Rathalos egg by Guardian Ratha. A Rathalos with small black wings bursts out of the egg, which is said to bring ruin to the world in time. As the story progresses, the player character faces many monsters that have pink, glowing eyes such as an anjanath, a diablos, a rathian , and  a legiana. These "rage-rayed" monsters attack and destroy everything they see, and the source seems to come from the pits. The Hunters believe that the birth of "Razewing Ratha" (the player's Rathalos) is the source and capture it. Eventually it is discovered that the Hunters are working with a mysterious group that wants Ratha for themselves. The player, however, is able to get Ratha back and escape with Ena, with Ratha spreading his wings in the process. Later, the player sees an enormous worm-like creature emerge from one of the pits and devour a Rathalos. This monster is later discovered to be a powerful Elder Dragon called Oltura, which has been creating the pits and luring Rathalos in to consume them and gain power. The pits' light starts to turn blue as the player and Ena tries to track down Oltura. Eventually, they go to Hakolo Island, Oltura's birthplace. The player and Ena then confront Zellard, who is revealed to be the leader of the mysterious group and intends to awaken Oltura in order to destroy the world and create a brand new one, having grown disillusioned with humanity after Red's death. Zellard nearly sacrifices Ratha to Oltura, but Oltura instead consumes Guardian Ratha, awakening fully. Kyle discovers during the issuing fight that the wings of Oltura are its weak points, and uses two relics that Ena wore around her neck as a pendant to destroy them. The player and Ratha then perform a Sky-High Dive on the weakened Oltura, killing it for good and saving the world after that the players kinship stone levels up to level 6.

Development
On September 17, 2020, Nintendo revealed the game during a Nintendo Direct Mini: Partner Showcase. This was then followed up with more information during the Monster Hunter-themed Nintendo Direct on the same day. In the broadcast, some story details were mentioned, and it was announced that the game will have some sort of cross-compatibility with Monster Hunter Rise. More information was revealed during the Tokyo Game Show.

Release
The game was released worldwide on the Nintendo Switch and Windows on July 9, 2021. A set of three Amiibo figures (Ena, Razewing Ratha and Tsukino) launched on the same day. To commemorate the release, a collectable Spirit was added to the crossover game Super Smash Bros. Ultimate.

Reception

Monster Hunter Stories 2: Wings of Ruin received "generally favorable reviews" according to Metacritic.

PCGamesN writes about the game "While the repetitiveness of its turn-based battle system can become frustrating, Monster Hunter Stories 2 is more than a novel twist on the main series' core components." awarding it an 8/10.

Sales
According to Famitsu, the Nintendo Switch version of the game sold 137,676 copies at retail to rank as the best-selling game in Japan in its week of release. In the United Kingdom, Monster Hunter Stories 2 debuted in third place, reportedly selling more than twice what the original game had done in its first week. In the United States, NPD Group reported that the game ranked as the third best selling release of the month, with sales tripling that of the previous entry's lifetime sales. It topped the global Steam charts in its first week, setting a new peak player count for a Japanese role-playing game's launch on the platform, surpassing Persona 4 Golden.

On July 20, 2021, Capcom announced that the game had shipped more than one million units worldwide. In January 2022, it was confirmed that sales of the game exceeded 1.4 million copies. In May 2022, Capcom confirmed that Monster Hunter Stories 2: Wings of Ruin had sold 1.5 million copies.

Note

References

External links
 Official website

2021 video games
Monster Hunter
Nintendo Switch games
Role-playing video games
Single-player video games
Video games developed in Japan
Video games that use Amiibo figurines
Video game sequels
Video game spin-offs
Windows games